Arthur Lyon (4 August 1851 – 4 December 1905) was a rugby union international who represented England in 1871.

Early life
Arthur Lyon's birth was registered in West Derby, Lancashire, he attended Rugby School, and then Oxford University, he died aged 54.

Rugby union career
Lyon played for both Oxford University and later for Liverpool. He was one of ten Old Rugbeians to make an international debut on 27 March 1871 at Edinburgh in the first international rugby match, and first meeting of Scotland and England match.

References

1851 births
1905 deaths
English rugby union players
England international rugby union players
Rugby union fullbacks
People educated at Rugby School
Rugby union players from Liverpool
Liverpool St Helens F.C. players